The 2018 United States Grand Prix (officially known as the Formula 1 Pirelli 2018 United States Grand Prix) was a Formula One motor race held on October 21, 2018, at the Circuit of the Americas in Austin, Texas, United States.

The race was won by Kimi Räikkönen, who made a one-stop strategy work, achieving his first Grand Prix win since the 2013 Australian Grand Prix, breaking a record-setting 113-race winless streak. It was also his first for Ferrari since 2009 and the first time that Ferrari had won at the Circuit of the Americas. This would also turn out to be the final victory of Räikkönen's F1 career.

Background

Championship standings before the race 
Mercedes driver Lewis Hamilton entered the round with a 67-point lead over Ferrari's Sebastian Vettel in the World Drivers' Championship. Hamilton's team-mate, Valtteri Bottas, sat third, a further 57 points behind. In the World Constructors' Championship, Mercedes held a lead of 78 points over Ferrari, with Red Bull Racing a further 141 points behind in third place.

Entrants 

Lando Norris and Sean Gelael drove in the first practice session instead of Stoffel Vandoorne and Brendon Hartley for McLaren and Toro Rosso respectively. Nicholas Latifi was supposed to drive in the same session in place of Esteban Ocon at Force India, but this was reversed ahead of the session.

Tyre choices 
Tyre supplier Pirelli selected the soft, supersoft and ultrasoft tyres for the Grand Prix weekend.

Qualifying

Notes
  – Sebastian Vettel received a three-place grid penalty for failing to slow sufficiently during a red flag period in Free Practice 1.
  – Pierre Gasly received a 35-place grid penalty for exceeding his quota of power unit elements.
  – Brendon Hartley received a 40-place grid penalty: 35 places for exceeding his quota of power unit elements and 5 places for an unscheduled gearbox change.
  – Max Verstappen received a five-place grid penalty for an unscheduled gearbox change.

Race
Kimi Räikkönen won the race from second as Mercedes struggled with pace as Lewis Hamilton could only managed third, beaten to second by Max Verstappen. Sebastian Vettel made an error at the start, spinning while battling with Daniel Ricciardo, eventually fighting back to finish fourth. Hamilton lost time when Mercedes waited too long before bringing him in for his second pit stop.

Race classification 

Notes
  – Esteban Ocon originally finished eighth, but was disqualified for exceeding fuel flow limits on lap 1.
  – Kevin Magnussen originally finished ninth, but was disqualified for consuming more than 105 kg of fuel during the race.

Championship standings after the race 

Drivers' Championship standings

Constructors' Championship standings

 Note: Only the top five positions are included for both sets of standings.
 Bold text and an asterisk indicates competitors who still had a theoretical chance of becoming World Champion.

References

United States
United States Grand Prix
Grand Prix
2018 in sports in Texas
Motorsport competitions in Texas
Sports in Austin, Texas
United States Grand Prix